This is a list of episodes of the TV series Sid the Science Kid.

As of 2023, Sid the Science Kid has aired and produced a total of 67 half-hour episodes. On March 25, 2013, a film titled Sid the Science Kid: The Movie, premiered on PBS. The show premiered on September 1, 2008 and concluded on March 25, 2013 with the aforementioned movie, albeit, the show stopped premiering new half-hours on November 15, 2012.

Series overview

Episodes

Season 1 (2008–2009)

Season 2 (2010–2012)

Special episodes

Season 1

Season 2

Film
Sid the Science Kid: The Movie premiered on March 25, 2013 on PBS, and it was released on DVD, iTunes, and in theaters on April 2, 2013.

Notes
 The information for the writer and the director are collected from the opening credits of each episode.

References

External links
 Sid the Science Kid's Official Website
 Where Did I Come From?
 Sid the Science Kid: The Movie on IMDb

Sid the Science Kid